Xenopeltis intermedius is a non-venomous sunbeam snake species found in Vietnam.

The specific epithet intermedius refers to this species showing a number of morphological characteristics that are intermediate between Xenopeltis unicolor and X. hainanensis.

References

Xenopeltidae
Reptiles of Vietnam
Reptiles described in 2022